The A4230 is a suburban main road in south Wales.

The A4230 is a single carriageway road for its whole length.  It begins at the Peniel Green roundabout (junction with the M4 motorway and the A48) in the far east of Llansamlet.  It travels east through the Lonlas area of Skewen before passing through central Skewen, after which it traverses the Neath Abbey area before connecting with the A474 at the Cwrt Herbert roundabout in Dyffryn Clydach.  It then follows the same road as the A474 along Neath Abbey Road then though Cadoxton until it connects with the A465 just south of Aberdulais.

References

Transport in Swansea
Transport in Neath Port Talbot
Roads in Wales